Jeanine Basinger (born 3 February 1936, Ravenden, Arkansas) is an American film historian who retired in 2020 as the Corwin-Fuller Professor of Film Studies and Founder and Curator of The Cinema Archives at Wesleyan University, Middletown, Connecticut.

Education
Basinger was raised in Brookings, South Dakota. She first became interested in film there, at The College Theater, where she worked as an usher as early as age 11. That job put her in the position of seeing the same film over and over, to which she attributes learning to see "the way films… [affect] the audience, … where they work and where they don't."
She attended and received her BS and MS from South Dakota State University.

Career
Basinger first arrived in Middletown, Connecticut, where Wesleyan University is located, in 1960 as marketing director of American Education Publications, then owned by the university and later sold to Xerox. In the late 1960s, art professor John Frazer recruited her into helping him set up the university's first "serious film course" at a time when it was, according to Sam Wasson, unclear what that meant. This soon evolved into her teaching a class at Wesleyan on her own, beginning in 1969, despite lacking the usual academic credentials. Basinger eventually received the title of Professor of Film Studies, and later an endowed chair as Corwin-Fuller Professor of Film Studies.

In 1970, she and then-student Laurence Mark established a student-run film series that eventually became the country's longest-lasting such series.
She was a pioneer of taking Hollywood film seriously as a subject of academic study, teaching the work of Clint Eastwood as early as 1971. Because of Basinger, Wesleyan increasingly became seen as a place for Hollywood figures to deposit their archives; among those who have done so are Elia Kazan, Frank Capra, and eventually the aforementioned Clint Eastwood. 

Under her leadership, by 1990 film had become a standalone program and major at Wesleyan separate from the art department, cross-listing courses with the art department and other established departments. It evolved into a formal department in 2000, with its own faculty and with Basinger as chair, a role she relinquished in 2016 before retiring in 2020, by which time that department had evolved into the College of Film and the Moving Image. 

Basinger is also a trustee emeritus of the American Film Institute, a member of the Steering Committee of the National Center for Film and Video Preservation, and one of the Board of Advisors for the Association of Independent Video and Filmmakers. On February 11, 2005, she was named to the board of directors of the National Board of Review of Motion Pictures. She is an advisor to Martin Scorsese's Film Foundation, produced an American Masters special on Clint Eastwood, and was head consultant and producer of PBS's American Cinema: 100 Years of Filmmaking, as well as author of its companion volume.

Legacy
Basinger has been described as "one of the most important film scholars alive today." Among other accomplishments, she is credited with having built Wesleyan's Film Studies program into one of the ten best film schools in the world. "A shockingly disproportionate number of Hollywood movers and shakers" are graduates of the program. Graduates include Akiva Goldsman, Joss Whedon, Michael Bay, Paul Weitz, Laurence Mark, Paul Schiff, Gary Walkow, Alex Kurtzman, Bruce Eric Kaplan, Toby Emmerich, Nick Meyer, Marc Shmuger, Rick Nicita, Bradley Fuller, Dana Delany, Stephen Schiff, Rodger Grossman, Toni Ross, Bradley Whitford, Sam Wasson, Domenica Cameron-Scorsese, Liz Garcia, Jon Turteltaub, Owen Renfroe, Jeffrey Lane, Ed Decter, Zak Penn, Jeremy Arnold and Miguel Arteta.

She has appeared in numerous documentaries, and also in a dramatic role in A Better Way to Die (2000). In 2006 she participated in Wanderlust, a documentary film on road movies and their effect on American culture.

Awards
1996 Wesleyan Binswanger Prize for Excellence in Teaching
1999 National Board of Review's William K. Everson Prize for Film History for Silent Stars
2005 Governor's Arts and Tourism Award from the Connecticut Commission on Culture and Tourism
Honorary Doctorate of Humane Letters from the American Film Institute on June 7, 2006
2008 Theatre Library Association Award for The Star Machine
2013 Wesleyan Binswanger Prize for Excellence in Teaching

Works

Books
The World War II Combat Film: Anatomy of a Genre (1985, 2003)
Anthony Mann: A Critical Study
The It's a Wonderful Life Book
Shirley Temple (1975)
Lana Turner (1976)
Gene Kelly (1976)
A Woman's View: How Hollywood Spoke to Women 1930-1960 (1993)
American Cinema: 100 Years of Filmmaking (companion book for a PBS series).
Silent Stars (1999)
The Star Machine, Alfred A. Knopf (2007). About the height of the studio system in the Golden Age from the 1930s to the 1950s.
I Do and I Don't: A History of Marriage in the Movies (2013)
The Movie Musical! (2019)

Audio commentaries
The Ghost and Mrs. Muir, with film historian Kenneth Geist
Gigi, with actress Leslie Caron
In This Our Life
It
It's a Wonderful Life (Criterion laserdisc)
Jezebel
Laura, with composer David Raksin
The Philadelphia Story
Pearl Harbor, with director Michael Bay
Sergeant York
The Tall T
Three Coins in the Fountain
Week-End in Havana
The Wild One

Notes

References
 Wesleyan Faculty Page (accessed 30 November 2014)
 
 Quotations from Jeanine Basinger (accessed 16 June 2006)
  (accessed 16 June 2006)
 WNYC Leonard Lopate June 3, 2013 interview on marriage and the movies.
 NY Times Review March 10, 2013 review of "I Do and I Don't"
 Washington Post Feb. 1, 2013 Review "I Do and I Don't"

1936 births
Living people
American art curators
American women curators
Film educators
American film historians
Film theorists
Wesleyan University faculty